Harlem River is the debut studio album by American indie rock musician Kevin Morby, released on November 26, 2013 by Woodsist Records. In 2017, the song "Harlem River" was featured in a Volvo advertisement and in 2018 for a Target Australia commercial.

Track listing

Personnel
Musicians
Kevin Morby – vocals, guitar
Justin Sullivan – drums, percussion
Dan Iead – guitar , slide guitar 
Will Canzoneri – bass , guitar and organ , glockenspiel ,
Tim Presley – bass , harmonica 

Additional musicians
Cate Le Bon – guest vocals on "Slow Train"

Production and artwork
Rob Barbato – producer, engineer, bass , chord organ , backing vocals , guitar 
Drew Fisher – engineer
John Greenham – mastering
Huw Evans – layout
Joyce George – cover photography

References

2013 debut albums
Kevin Morby albums
Woodsist albums